František Sláma (19 November 1923 – 5 May 2004) was a Czech chamber music performer. He was the first Czech cellist who focused on Early music.

Biography
Sláma was born in Herálec. Until the age of 18 he worked in the quarry. His meeting with the famous Czech cello pedagogue Karel P. Sádlo proved to be a turning point in his life. Sádlo supported him, introduced him to the cello (1941) and tutored him for the Conservatoire (1942–1948, cello with K. P. Sádlo, chamber music with Václav Talich). Between 1948 and 1952 Sláma completed his studies at the Academy of Performing Arts in Prague. By this time he had already been a member of the Czech Philharmonic Orchestra (1948–1981, since 1962 sub-principal cello and cello section leader).

Conductor Václav Talich encouraged Sláma's enthusiasm for chamber music and had, along with K. P. Sádlo and later Milan Munclinger, a lasting influence on Sláma's musical development. During the next 45 years Sláma performed with leading chamber ensembles in Czechoslovakia. In 1946 he was a founding member of Talich's Czech Chamber Orchestra, between 1953–1976 the viol da gambist of Pro Arte Antiqua (one of the oldest European ensembles focused on medieval and Renaissance music) and between 1954–1997 a member of the ensemble Ars Rediviva, whose performances and recordings played an important role in the revival of the Baroque music in Czechoslovakia.

With these ensembles he made a large number of recordings (with Supraphon, Panton, Columbia, DGG, Ariola, and Nippon), which received several awards both in Czechoslovakia and abroad (e.g. Grand Prix du Disque). He participated also in first performances of modern compositions (e.g. Ilja Hurník: Sonata da camera, Jan Tausinger: Evocations).

Pedagogue and publicist
Since the 1970s he was a teacher at the Conservatoire in Prague. He also wrote about music and musicians, cooperated with Czech Radio (e.g. introduced Jordi Savall to the Czech audience).
In 2001 his book "Z Herálce do Šangrilá a zase nazpátek" (“From Heralec to Shangrila and Back Again”) was published - reminiscences about the Prague music scene between the 1940s and the 1990s as well as about Sláma's musical colleagues, conductors (Talich, Barbirolli, Cluytens, Karajan, Kleiber, Klemperer, Kletzki, Kubelík, Maazel, Mackerras, Markevitch, Matačić, Mravinsky, Münch, Pedrotti, Rozhdestvensky, Sawallisch, Stokowski, etc.) and other personalities whom he had met (e.g. Adorján, André, Fournier, Honegger, Mainardi, Menuhin, Milhaud, Navarra, Nureyev, Oistrakh, Rampal, Richter, Szeryng, Sudek, Tortelier).

František Sláma archive
František Sláma archive collection donated to his native village Herálec consists of more than 5,000 negatives and photos, over 150 hours of authentic recordings and documents about Czech Philharmonic Orchestra, Václav Talich, Milan Muclinger, Ars Rediviva, etc. Live recordings of Ars Rediviva performances in Rudolfinum are also deposited in the Czech Music Museum (see: External links).

References

Further reading
  Sláma, František: Z Herálce do Šangrilá a zase nazpátek. Říčany: Orego, 2001. 
 The Art Of Jean-Pierre Rampal
 ABC Classic FM, 11 June 2007
 J.S.Bach Home Page, Recordings, Ars Rediviva, Brandenburg Concertos
 J.S.Bach Home Page, Recordings, Ars Rediviva, The Art of Fugue
 J.S.Bach Home Page, Recordings, Ars Rediviva, The Musical Offering
 The Czech Music Museum

External links
 František Sláma Archive 
 Ars Rediviva Discography 
  Czech Radio: František Sláma's recordings
  Czech Radio: Ars Rediviva recordings
 WorldCat Libraries (November 2007)

1923 births
2004 deaths
People from Žďár nad Sázavou District
Czech classical musicians
Czech classical cellists
Viol players
Czech performers of early music
20th-century classical musicians
20th-century cellists